In metaphysics and the philosophy of language, the round square copula is a common example of the dual copula strategy used in reference to the problem of nonexistent objects as well as their relation to problems in modern philosophy of language.

The issue arose, most notably, between the theories of contemporary philosophers Alexius Meinong (see Meinong's 1904 book Investigations in Theory of Objects and Psychology) and Bertrand Russell (see Russell's 1905 article "On Denoting"). Russell's critique of Meinong's theory of objects, also known as the Russellian view, became the established view on the problem of nonexistent objects.

In late modern philosophy, the concept of the "square circle" had also been discussed before in Gottlob Frege's The Foundations of Arithmetic (1884).

The dual copula strategy

The strategy employed is the dual copula strategy, also known as the dual predication approach, which is used to make a distinction between relations of properties and individuals. It entails creating a sentence that is not supposed to make sense by forcing the term "is" into ambiguous meaning.

The dual copula strategy was originally brought to prominence in contemporary philosophy by Ernst Mally. Other proponents of this approach include: Héctor-Neri Castañeda, William J. Rapaport, and Edward N. Zalta.

By borrowing Zalta's notational method (Fb stands for b exemplifies the property of being F; bF stands for b encodes the property of being F), and using a revised version of Meinongian object theory which makes use of a dual copula distinction (MOTdc), we can say that the object called "the round square" encodes the property of being round, the property of being square, all properties implied by these, and no others. But it is true that there are also infinitely many properties being exemplified by an object called the round square (and, really, any object)—e.g. the property of not being a computer, and the property of not being a pyramid. Note that this strategy has forced "is" to abandon its predicative use, and now functions abstractly.

When one now analyzes the round square copula using the MOTdc, one will find that it now avoids the three common paradoxes: (1) The violation of the law of noncontradiction, (2) The paradox of claiming the property of existence without actually existing, and (3) producing counterintuitive consequences. Firstly, the MOTdc shows that the round square does not exemplify the property of being round, but the property of being round and square. Thus, there is no subsequent contradiction. Secondly, it avoids the conflict of existence/non-existence by claiming non-physical existence: by the MOTdc, it can only be said that the round square simply does not exemplify the property of occupying a region in space. Finally, the MOTdc avoids counterintuitive consequences (like a 'thing' having the property of nonexistence) by stressing that the round square copula can be said merely to encode the property of being round and square, not actually exemplifying it. Thus, logically, it does not belong to any set or class.

In the end, what the MOTdc really does is create a kind of object: a nonexistent object that is very different from the objects we might normally think of. Occasionally, references to this notion, while obscure, may be called "Meinongian objects."

The dual property strategy
Making use of the notion of "non-physically existent" objects is controversial in philosophy, and created the buzz for many articles and books on the subject during the first half of the 20th century. There are other strategies for avoiding the problems of Meinong's theories, but they suffer from serious problems as well.

First is the dual property strategy, also known as the nuclear–extranuclear strategy.

Mally introduced the dual property strategy, but did not endorse it. The dual property strategy was eventually adopted by Meinong. Other proponents of this approach include: Terence Parsons and Richard Routley.

According to Meinong, it is possible to distinguish the natural (nuclear) properties of an object, from its external (extranuclear) properties. Parsons identifies four types of extranuclear properties: ontological, modal, intentional, technical—however, philosophers dispute Parson's claims in number and kind. Additionally, Meinong states that nuclear properties are either constitutive or consecutive, meaning properties that are either explicitly contained or implied/included in a description of the object. Essentially the strategy denies the possibility for objects to have only one property, and instead they may have only one nuclear property. Meinong himself, however, found this solution to be inadequate in several ways and its inclusion only served to muddle the definition of an object.

The other worlds strategy
There is also the other worlds strategy. Similar to the ideas explained with possible worlds theory, this strategy employs the view that logical principles and the law of contradiction have limits, but without assuming that everything is true. Enumerated and championed by Graham Priest, who was heavily influenced by Routley, this strategy forms the notion of "noneism". In short, assuming there exist infinite possible and impossible worlds, objects are freed from necessarily existing in all worlds, but instead may exist in impossible worlds (where the law of contradiction does not apply, for example) and not in the actual world. Unfortunately, accepting this strategy entails accepting the host of problems that come with it, such as the ontological status of impossible worlds.

See also

List of paradoxes
Platonic realism
Theory of descriptions
Wooden iron

References

Sources
 

Analytic philosophy
Abstract object theory
Paradoxes
20th-century philosophy